Liikatku is a village in Jõgeva Parish, Jõgeva County in Estonia.

References

Villages in Jõgeva County